Canterbury University is an unaccredited and private degree-granting institution. According to its website, Canterbury University was established in 1974 in Hyde-Cheshire, Manchester, United Kingdom and is an independent university that delivers various specialized scientific courses. The address used by Canterbury University is the address of a company called Mail Accommodation Office Services. It has been reported that Canterbury University in the Republic of Seychelles is associated with instantdegrees.com.

According to the Higher Education Degree Datacheck website, Canterbury University is not a valid UK degree awarding body.

Recognition
According to the British Department for Innovation, Universities and Skills, Canterbury University is neither a recognised body for UK degree awards, nor is it a listed body, neither is Canterbury University accredited by any higher education accreditation organization recognized by the United States Department of Education or the Council for Higher Education Accreditation. Its degrees may not be acceptable to employers or other institutions, and use of degree titles may be restricted or illegal in some jurisdictions.
 A 2005 article in World Education News & Reviews discussed the continua of legitimacy and acceptability of academic institutions, ranging from "highly legitimate" and "highly acceptable" to "illegal" and "no acceptability" respectively; the author stated that although Canterbury University and others like it operate legally and the degrees conferred are "acceptable to some", it is an example of an institution "further down" both scales.

Degree recipients
The city manager of a Florida municipality was fired in 2007 and later charged with the criminal offense of making false claims after it was discovered that his claimed PhD and master's degrees were from Canterbury University, which was described as "a 'diploma mill' rather than a legitimate school of higher learning". The criminal case was dismissed in 2009. Reasons for dismissal included a finding that the city manager had not falsely claimed to hold an academic degree, as alleged, because he did hold a degree from Canterbury University, as well as a concern that the prosecution had failed to provide essential details regarding the alleged offense. The manager, Jerry Tramel, issued a statement saying that he had been "exonerated," but an assistant state attorney told news media that this interpretation was "overblown."

In February 2013, a Lancaster, Pennsylvania, woman was sentenced to seven years' probation for two felony counts of fraud that involved using a diploma from Canterbury University to get counseling jobs.

See also
 List of unaccredited institutions of higher learning

References

External links
 
 

Unaccredited institutions of higher learning
Educational institutions established in 1974